Francis Graham Wilson (1901–1976), was a professor of political science at the University of Illinois (1939–67).

References

American political scientists
University of Illinois alumni
1901 births
1976 deaths
University of Illinois faculty
20th-century political scientists